CJ Fish is the fifth album by the San Francisco psychedelic rock group, Country Joe and the Fish, released in May 1970 on the Vanguard label. It would be the first production with Tom Wilson and Country Joe & the Fish's  last studio album for Vanguard Records. Recording took place at the Record Plant in Los Angeles, California.

After extensive touring with a new lineup, including Big Brother and the Holding Company guitarist Peter Albin, the makeshift group returned to the recording studio. Country Joe McDonald had already begun producing and recording solo albums for the label at the point of recording. As for the band, Country Joe and the Fish underwent a personnel change for this album adding  drummer Greg Dewey, bassist Doug Metzner, and keyboardist Mark Kapner in place of David Cohen and Gary "Chicken" Hirsh. Primary composers Barry "The Fish" Melton and "Country Joe" McDonald remained, resulting in an album that retained the sound and style of the original lineup. The new lineup would tour extensively around the time the Woodstock film was released and the group was included in the film Zachariah as outlaws known as "The Crackers".

After experimenting on the previous album Here We Are Again (1969), the band reverted to their earlier sound that originated from their first two albums for the CJ Fish album. Although the album is psychedelic in nature, it is noted to be pop-orientated. Vanguard Records attempted to make the band more mainstream and this was the closest result that the group could produce as it is still very much underground. Track themes were still centered on the subjects of love and life as commonly done by the band. Despite the success of their tour, respectable album charting, and movie feature, the band would disband in the following year.

Track listing
All tracks composed by Country Joe McDonald; except where indicated
Side one
"Sing Sing Sing" (Barry Melton) – 3:01
"She's a Bird" – 4:33
"Mara" – 2:57
"Hang On" – 4:08
"The Baby Song" – 2:50
"Hey Bobby" – 2:06

Side two
"Silver and Gold" – 2:47
"Rockin' Round the World" – 4:54
"The Love Machine" (Melton) – 5:48
"The Return of Sweet Lorraine" – 3:46
"Hand of Man" – 2:50

Original Vinyl release: Vanguard VSD.6555 [May 1970]
Original CD release:  Vanguard 6555-2 [May 10, 1994]

Personnel
Joe McDonald - vocals, guitar
Barry Melton - vocals, guitar
Greg Dewey -   drums
Doug Metzner - bass guitar
Mark Kapner -  keyboard
Peter Albin -   guitar
Technical
Producer: Tom Wilson
Art direction: Jules Halfant
Cover art: David Edward Byrd
Back liner photo: Jules Kliot

Charts

Releases

 CD	CJ Fish Vanguard	 1994
 Cassette	CJ Fish Vanguard	 1994
 CD	CJ Fish Vanguard	 1994
 CD	C.J. & The Fish Vanguard	 1998
 CD	CJ Fish Ace	 1998
 Digi	CJ Fish Vanguard

References

1970 albums
Country Joe and the Fish albums
Albums produced by Tom Wilson (record producer)
Vanguard Records albums